
Gmina Margonin is an urban-rural gmina (administrative district) in Chodzież County, Greater Poland Voivodeship, in west-central Poland.

Villages
Apart from the town of Margonin, Gmina Margonin contains the villages and settlements of Adolfowo, Bugaj, Dębiniec, Karolinka, Klaudia, Klotyldzin, Kowalewo, Lipiniec, Lipiny, Marcinek, Margońska Wieś, Młynary, Próchnowo, Radwanki, Studźce, Sułaszewo, Sypniewo, Tereska, Witkowice, Zbyszewice and Żoń.

Neighbouring gminas
Gmina Margonin is bordered by the gminas of Budzyń, Chodzież, Gołańcz, Szamocin and Wągrowiec.

References
Polish official population figures 2006

Margonin
Chodzież County